Olena Hayasova (born 10 May 1969) is a Ukrainian cross-country skier. She competed in five events at the 1998 Winter Olympics.

References

External links
 

1969 births
Living people
Ukrainian female cross-country skiers
Olympic cross-country skiers of Ukraine
Cross-country skiers at the 1998 Winter Olympics
People from Vologda